Yousef Taysir Jabareen (born 23 February 1972) is an Israeli Arab academic and politician. He served as a member of the Knesset for Hadash and the Joint List between 2015 and 2021.

Biography
Jabareen was born in Umm al-Fahm. He studied law at the Hebrew University of Jerusalem, gaining an LLB in 1995. He studied for an LLM at the Washington College of Law at the American University in Washington, DC, graduating in 1997, and earned a PhD at the Georgetown University Law Center in 2003. He lectured at the Washington College of Law between 2002 and 2003, and at the Centre for Jewish Studies at the University of Maryland in 2003, before becoming a member of the Faculty of Law at the University of Haifa and Tel Aviv University in 2004. He stopped teaching at Tel Aviv University in 2009, and became a faculty member at Tel-Hai Academic College. He also heads the Dirasat Arab Centre for Law and Policy in Nazareth, and was legal director at the northern branch of the Association for Civil Rights in Israel between 1997 and 2000.

A member of Hadash, prior to the 2015 elections he was placed tenth on the Joint List list, an alliance of Hadash, Balad, the Islamic Movement, the United Arab List and Ta'al. He was elected to the Knesset as the alliance won 13 seats. For the April 2019 elections, Hadash ran in alliance with Ta'al; Jabareen was placed sixth on the list, and was re-elected as the parties won six seats. The Joint List was reformed for the September 2019 elections, with Jabareen in tenth place. He remained an MK as the alliance won 13 seats. He was placed tenth on the Joint List's list again for the March 2020 elections and was re-elected. Prior to the 2021 elections he was placed eighth on the Joint List, but lost his seat as the alliance was reduced to six seats.

References

External links

Living people
1972 births
People from Umm al-Fahm
Hebrew University of Jerusalem Faculty of Law alumni
Washington College of Law alumni
Georgetown University Law Center alumni
Washington College of Law faculty
University of Maryland, College Park faculty
Academic staff of the University of Haifa
Academic staff of Tel Aviv University
Academic staff of Tel-Hai Academic College
Arab members of the Knesset
Hadash politicians
Members of the 20th Knesset (2015–2019)
Members of the 21st Knesset (2019)
Members of the 22nd Knesset (2019–2020)
Members of the 23rd Knesset (2020–2021)
Israeli people of Saudi Arabian descent